Blair Hrovat (born November 20, 1962) is an American football coach and former player. Hrovat was the head football coach at Allegheny College in Meadville, Pennsylvania for four seasons, from 1998 to 2001, compiling a record of 26–14.  He was forced to resign this position due to falsifications on his resume. Hrovat was the head football coach at Princeton Community High School in Princeton, Indiana from 2010 to 2011.

Head coaching record

College

References

1962 births
Living people
American football quarterbacks
Allegheny Gators football coaches
Edinboro Fighting Scots football players
Indiana State Sycamores football coaches
San Francisco State Gators football coaches
South Dakota Coyotes football coaches
Winnipeg Blue Bombers coaches
High school football coaches in Georgia (U.S. state)
High school football coaches in Indiana
Sportspeople from Cleveland
People from Princeton, Indiana
Coaches of American football from Ohio
Players of American football from Cleveland